The 2016 Southland Conference tournament was held at Cowgirl Diamond on the campus of McNeese State University in Lake Charles, Louisiana, from May 11 through 13, 2016. The tournament winner, the McNeese State Cowgirls, earned the Southland Conference's automatic bid to the 2016 NCAA Division I softball tournament. The Championship game was broadcast on ESPN3 with the remainder of the tournament airing on the Southland Digital Network.

Format
The top 6 teams qualified for the Southland softball tournament. Abilene Christian and Incarnate Word were ineligible due to their transition from D2 to D1. Abilene Christian finished the regular season in third place.  Since Abilene Christian was ineligible for tournament play, the fourth through seventh place finishers moved up in seeding.  In addition, the Sam Houston Bearkats, finishing the regular season in seventh place, qualified for the tournament.

Tournament
Sources:

New Orleans does not sponsor a softball team.
All times listed are Central Daylight Time.

Line Scores

Day One

Game 1 (Sam Houston State vs Lamar)

Game 2 (Stephen F. Austin vs Central Arkansas)

Game 3 (Lamar vs Nicholls)

Game 4 (Stephen F. Austin vs McNeese State)

Day Two

Game 5 (Stephen F. Austin vs Sam Houston State)

Game 6 (Central Arkansas vs Nicholls State)

Game 7 (Lamar vs McNeese State)

Semi-final Game One (Nicholls vs Stephen F. Austin)

Day Three

Semi-final Game Two (Lamar vs Stephen F. Austin)

Championship Game (Lamar vs McNeese State)

Awards and honors
Source:  

Tournament MVP: Erika Piancastelli, McNeese State

All-Tournament Teams:

 Morgan Catron, McNeese State
 Tori Yanator, McNeese State
 Emily Vincent, McNeese State
 Brittany Rodriguez, Lamar
 Jenna Holland, Lamar
 Ciara Luna, Lamar
 Kelly Meeuwsen, Lamar
 Stephanie Meeuwsen, Lamar
 Taylor Fraccastoro, Stephen F. Austin
 Annie Mehringer, Stephen F. Austin
 Callee Guffey, Stephen F. Austin

See also
2016 Southland Conference baseball tournament

References

Southland Conference softball tournament
Tournament